Ridgeside is a city in Hamilton County, Tennessee, United States. The population was 446 at the 2020 census and estimated to be 432 in 2018. Ridgeside is an enclave, as it is completely surrounded by the city limits of Chattanooga. It is part of the Chattanooga, TN–GA Metropolitan Statistical Area. Ridgeside's name is derived from its location on the eastern slope (side) of Missionary Ridge. Locally, the city is also known as Shepherd Hills, after the bigger of its two subdivisions, the other being Crescent Park.

History
Ridgeside is rooted in a dairy farm operated by John T. Shepherd in the early 1900s. In 1922, John's son, Paul, began building the "Shepherd Hills" subdivision, which was completed in 1952. Shepherd Hills incorporated as a city with the name "Ridgeside" in 1931, in part to avoid being annexed by rapidly growing Chattanooga.

Police services for the city of Ridgeside is served by the East Ridge Police, although at one time the city had its own police department.

Geography

Demographics

2020 census

As of the 2020 United States census, there were 446 people, 203 households, and 180 families residing in the city.

2000 census
As of the census of 2000, there were 389 people, 156 households, and 112 families residing in the city. The population density was 2,250.6 people per square mile (883.5/km2). There were 162 housing units at an average density of 937.3 per square mile (367.9/km2). The racial makeup of the city was 92.54% White, 5.14% African American, and 2.31% from two or more races. Hispanic or Latino of any race were 0.77% of the population.

There were 156 households, out of which 30.1% had children under the age of 18 living with them, 63.5% were married couples living together, 7.1% had a female householder with no husband present, and 27.6% were non-families. 25.0% of all households were made up of individuals, and 16.7% had someone living alone who was 65 years of age or older. The average household size was 2.49 and the average family size was 2.97.

In the city, the population was spread out, with 25.7% under the age of 18, 3.9% from 18 to 24, 18.8% from 25 to 44, 30.6% from 45 to 64, and 21.1% who were 65 years of age or older. The median age was 46 years. For every 100 females, there were 81.8 males. For every 100 females age 18 and over, there were 79.5 males.

The median income for a household in the city was $88,996, and the median income for a family was $96,602. Males had a median income of $63,750 versus $45,313 for females. The per capita income for the city was $35,138. About 1.8% of families and 4.6% of the population were below the poverty line, including 3.2% of those under age 18 and 3.9% of those age 65 or over.

References

External links
City of Ridgeside official website

Cities in Tennessee
Cities in Hamilton County, Tennessee
Cities in the Chattanooga metropolitan area
Neighborhoods in Chattanooga, Tennessee